Zane Moosa (born 23 September 1968) is a South African former footballer who played at both professional and international levels as a midfielder. Moosa played club football in South Africa and Saudi Arabia for Wits University, Mamelodi Sundowns, Avendale Athletico, Al-Ahli and Kaizer Chiefs; he also earned five caps for the South African national side between 1992 and 1996. He was part of the squad that won the 1996 African Cup of Nations.

Moosa made his professional debut on 21 June 1986 in a 1-1 draw against Kaizer Chiefs which would be his last club.

His older brother Essop Moosa was also a footballer.

References

External links

1968 births
Living people
Africa Cup of Nations-winning players
South African soccer players
South African expatriate soccer players
South Africa international soccer players
1996 African Cup of Nations players
Mamelodi Sundowns F.C. players
Bidvest Wits F.C. players
Kaizer Chiefs F.C. players
Association football midfielders
People from the City of Tshwane Metropolitan Municipality
South African Muslims
South African people of Indian descent
Al-Ahli Saudi FC players
Expatriate footballers in Saudi Arabia
South African expatriate sportspeople in Saudi Arabia
Saudi Professional League players
Soccer players from Gauteng